Michael Penn is the Teresa Hihn Moore Professor of Religious Studies at Stanford University, and formerly taught at Mount Holyoke College in Massachusetts.

His writings include the book Kissing Christians: Ritual, Community, and the Late Ancient Church.  He received a Guggenheim Fellowship and other grants for studies of the Syriac Christians and their relationship to Islam.  He was quoted in USA Today regarding the veracity of the Gospel of Judas.

Penn's courses at Mount Holyoke included "What Didn't Make It into the Bible" and "Sex and the Early Church". Penn studied molecular biology and was a debater at Princeton University, then received his Ph.D. from Duke University.  He attended Pinewood High School in California, from which he graduated in 1989.

References

External links
Faculty profile at Stanford University

Living people
Year of birth missing (living people)
American religion academics
Mount Holyoke College faculty
Princeton University alumni
Duke University alumni
Place of birth missing (living people)
American non-fiction writers
American historians of religion
Academics from California
Stanford University Department of Religious Studies faculty